The Hult Center for the Performing Arts is a performing arts venue in Eugene, Oregon.

The Hult Center is located downtown on Willamette Street between 6th & 7th Avenues, adjacent to the Graduate Eugene (previously Hilton Eugene) and Conference Center.  Built using funds that were approved by voters in 1978, the Hult Center and the Hilton were completed in 1982 as part of the same urban renewal project.

The Hult Center is operated by the City of Eugene and is one of two performing arts venues owned by the City. Cuthbert Amphitheater, located in Eugene's Alton Baker Park, is also owned by the City and is operated by Kesey Enterprises.

Twenty-seven architectural firms competed for the opportunity to design the center, but in the end, the Eugene City Council awarded the contract to the New York firm of Hardy Holzman Pfeiffer Associates. The firm had previously designed the $7.5-million, 2,700-seat Minneapolis Orchestra Hall and the $13-million Boettcher Concert Hall at the Denver Center for the Performing Arts.

Performance and other facilities
The Hult Center houses 2 performance halls, a meeting venue and a variety of public art:
 Silva Concert Hall, 2,448 seats
 Soreng Theater, 495 seats
 The Studio, capacity 200 Jacobs Community Room The Cuthbert Amphitheater''', in Eugene's Alton Baker Park, approximately 5,000 seats.

Resident companies
Resident companies at the Hult Center must satisfy a minimum number of performance and audience attendance requirements.  In return, they enjoy certain priority scheduling privileges, hall rental discounts and the ability to apply for funding from the Hult Endowment.  The residency requirements are not always easy to achieve or maintain.  The current resident companies are:

 Ballet Fantastique
 Eugene Ballet
 Eugene Concert Choir
 Eugene Opera
 Eugene Symphony
 Oregon Bach Festival

See also
List of concert halls
List of contemporary amphitheatres

References

External links
Hult Center for the Performing Arts

Music venues in Oregon
Theatres in Oregon
Landmarks in Oregon
Performing arts centers in Oregon
Culture of Eugene, Oregon
Buildings and structures in Eugene, Oregon
Tourist attractions in Eugene, Oregon
1982 establishments in Oregon